Tobing is a surname. Notable people with the surname include:

 Gordon Tobing (1925–1993), Indonesian singer
 Joy Tobing (born 1980), Indonesian singer
 Naek Tobing (1940–2020), Indonesian physician, sexologist, and author
 Ria Tobing (1938–2017), Indonesian swimmer

See also
 Ferdinand Lumban Tobing Airport
 Tobin (disambiguation)